Children of the Sun is a 1962 Moroccan film directed by Jacques Séverac. It was entered into the 1962 Cannes Film Festival.

Cast
 Abdelkader Abderrahmane
 Aziz Afifi
 Mustapha Brick
 Mohammed Zubir
 Amina Belkahia
 Abdou
 Mohammed Afifi
 Hassan Essakali
 Ahmed Jillali

References

External links

1962 films
Moroccan drama films
1960s Arabic-language films
Moroccan black-and-white films
Films directed by Jacques Séverac